Hermann Ludwig was a German film editor of the post-war era. He edited thirty German films and television series between 1947 and 1964.

Selected filmography
 Marriage in the Shadows (1947)
 Thank You, I'm Fine (1948)
 The Blue Swords (1949)
 The Heath Is Green (1951)
 Don't Ask My Heart (1952)
 When the Heath Dreams at Night (1952)
 Captain Wronski (1954)
 Heroism after Hours (1955)
 The Immenhof Girls (1955)
 My Children and I (1955)
 The Blue Moth (1959)
 Freddy, the Guitar and the Sea (1959)
 Rommel Calls Cairo (1959)
 Freddy and the Melody of the Night (1960)
 The Forger of London (1961)
 The Lightship (1963)
 Encounter in Salzburg (1964)

References

Bibliography
 Pitts, Michael R. Famous Movie Detectives III. Scarecrow Press, 2004.

External links

Year of birth unknown
Year of death unknown
German film editors